Toomas Hussar (born 1 May 1962 in Tallinn) is an Estonian actor, film and theatre director, playwright and dramaturge.

From 1986 to 1988 he studied at Tallinn State Conservatory in acting  speciality.

Selected filmography

 1994 "Tulivesi" (feature film; role: student)
 1999 "Sellised kolm lugu: Kõrbekuu" (feature film; role: visitor)
 2007 "Jan Uuspõld läheb Tartusse" (feature film; role: sacristan)
 2007 "Kuhu põgenevad hinged" (feature film; role: businessman) 
 2012 "Seenelkäik" (feature film; director and scenarist)
 2016 "Luuraja ja luuletaja" (feature film; director and scenarist)

References

Living people
1962 births
Estonian film directors
Estonian screenwriters
Estonian dramatists and playwrights
Estonian male film actors
Estonian Academy of Music and Theatre alumni
Male actors from Tallinn
Writers from Tallinn